Api Marenne Na is a 2014 Sri Lankan Sinhala black comedy film directed by Mohan Niyaz and produced by Ruwan Rukmal Thilakarathne for Nilwala Films. It stars Palitha Silva and Semini Iddamalgoda in lead roles along with Kumara Thirimadura and Lucky Dias. It is the 1218th Sri Lankan film in the Sinhala cinema.

Shooting of the film was completed in and around Colombo, Kandy, Kalutara and Panadura.

Plot

Cast
 Palitha Silva as Manoj Amarajeewa
 Semini Iddamalgoda as Amarajeewa's wife		
 Kumara Thirimadura as Mangala Pushpakumara		
 Lucky Dias as Ginige		
 Sarath Kothalawala as Vidyaratne
 Anton Jude as Deepal
 D.B. Gangodathenna		
 Sanoja Bibile	as Ginige's wife	
 Chanchala Warnasooriya		
 Upali Keerthisena		
 Roshan Jayasundara		
 Sandali Sulakna
 Sugath Janaka		
 Upali Senarathna		
 Nirdha Uyanhewa

References

External links
 

2014 films
2010s Sinhala-language films